Revel Governorate or Tallinn Governorate was an administrative unit in the Russian Empire from 1719 to 1783.

History
The Tallinn Governorate was originally formed in 1719, by the Russian Tsar Peter the Great's decree of 29 May 1719, and included four North-Estonian counties (Läänemaa, Harjumaa, Järvamaa and Virumaa), as the Narva region was originally merged with the St Petersburg Governorate.

The Estonian territories were conquered from Sweden in the Northern War by the Russian Tsarist troops in October 1710 (Viibur on 24 June 1710, Riga on 15 July, Pärnu on 23 August, then Paide and Haapsalu, Kuressaare on 26 September and Tallinn on 10 October).

In the course of the Northern War, the Russian troops had already conquered Virumaa, which was called Narva Province, and Tartumaa, which was called Tartu Province (Дерптский уезд), and which were part of the St Petersburg Governorate, in 1708.

Sweden formally ceded the territories of Estonia conquered during the 1710 war in the Treaty of Uusikaupunki in 1721. After the Great Northern War, the Swedish system of administration and government remained in Estonia. This was ensured by the acts of capitulation of the Estonian towns, by which the Estonian knighthood and the town of Tallinn surrendered to the Russian troops in the Great Northern War.

From 1713 to 1722, Tartu county belonged to the governorate. However in 1722 Tartu county rejoined the Riga Governorate.

In 1727, Narva County was separated from the St. Petersburg Governorate, but the town of Narva and Jaanilinna remained in the St. Petersburg Governorate, where it was the capital of Jamburg County from 1775 to 1802. The eastern border of the Revel Governorate (Narva County) began at Joala Manor and went to the mouth of the Narva River, but further work on defining the border stopped in 1784.

In 1783, Tallinn deputy governorate was formed from Tallinn governorate, and in 1796, together with Narva county, which was separated from St. Petersburg governorate, the Estonian governorate was formed.

Administrative Divisions
In 1719, the Russian Empire carried out a reform of the administrative division of territories, dividing governorates into provinces and provinces into districts. The administrative division of the Tallinn Governorate, due to its small territory, was not divided into provinces, but only into districts, and in 1719 was as follows:

Harju district (Russian: Гарриенский дистрикт), which included the parishes of Kuusalu, Jõelähtme, Harju-Jaani, Jüri, Juuru, Kose, Rapla, Hageri, Nissi, Keila, Madise and Risti.
Virumaa distrikt (Вирляндский дистрикт) comprising the parishes of Jõhvi, Vaivara, Lüganuse, Viru-Nigula, Rakvere, Haljala, Kadrina, Jaagupi, Väike-Maarja and Simuna
Järva distrikt (Эрвенский дистрикт) comprising the parishes of Ambla, Jaani, Madise, Koeru, Peetri, Anna and Türi
Haapsalu district (Викский дистрикт), comprising Märjamaa, Vigala, Kullamaa, Martna, Kirbla, Lääne-Nigula, Ridala, Lihula, Karuse, Hanila, Mihkli, Haapsalu parishes and islands.

Governors

1710 - 1711 , Governor General of Tallinn Rudolph Felix Bauer (1667–1717)
1711 - 1719 , Governor General of Tallinn Aleksandr Menshikov (1673–1729)
1719 - 1728 , Governor General of Tallinn Fyodor Apraksin (1661–1728)
1728 - 1736 , Governor General of Tallinn Baron Friedrich von Löwen (1654–1744)
1736–1736 , Governor / Governor-General of Estonia Count Platon Mussin-Pushkin (1698–1742), True State Counselor (Secret Counselor)
1736 –1738, Governor General of Tallinn Lieutenant General Sebastian Ernst von Manstein (died 1747)
1738 –1740, Governor General of Tallinn Count Gustav Otto Douglas (1687–1771), Lieutenant General
1740–1743 , Governor General of Tallinn Count Ulrich Friedrich Woldemar von Löwendal (1700–1755), general en chef
1743 –1753, Governor General of Tallinn Holstein-Beck Duke Peter August Friedrich (1698–1775), General Porch
1753 –1758, Governor General of Tallinn, Prince Vladimir Dolgorukov (1696–1761), Major General (General Porch)
1758 - 1762 , Governor General of Tallinn Holstein-Beck Duke Peter August Friedrich, general en chef
1762 - 1775 , Governor General of Estonia Peter August Friedrich von Holstein-Beck (1696–1775)
1775 - 1783 , Governor General of Estonia George Browne (1698–1792)

See also
Baltic governorates

References

Baltic governorates
History of Estonia
1719 establishments